Palamu Lok Sabha constituency (formerly Palamau Lok Sabha constituency) is one of the 14 Lok Sabha (parliamentary) constituencies in Jharkhand state in eastern India. This constituency is reserved for candidates belonging to the Scheduled castes. This constituency covers the entire Garhwa district and part of Palamu district.

Assembly segments
Palamu Lok Sabha constituency comprises the following six Vidhan Sabha (legislative assembly) segments:

Members of Parliament
1952: Gajendra Prasad Sinha, Indian National Congress
1957: Gajendra Prasad Sinha, Indian National Congress
1962: Shashank Manjari, Swatantra Party
1967: Kamala Kumari, Indian National Congress
1971: Kamala Kumari, Indian National Congress
1977: Ramdeni Ram, Janata Party
1980: Kamala Kumari, Indian National Congress
1984: Kamala Kumari, Indian National Congress
1989: Jorawar Ram, Janata Dal
1991: Ram Deo Ram, Bharatiya Janata Party
1996: Braj Mohan Ram, Bharatiya Janata Party
1998: Braj Mohan Ram, Bharatiya Janata Party
1999: Braj Mohan Ram, Bharatiya Janata Party
2004: Manoj Kumar, Rashtriya Janata Dal
2006: Ghuran Ram, Rashtriya Janata Dal
2009: Kameshwar Baitha, Jharkhand Mukti Morcha
2014: Vishnu Dayal Ram, Bharatiya Janata Party
2019: Vishnu Dayal Ram, Bharatiya Janata Party

Election results

See also
 Palamu district
 Garhwa district
 List of Constituencies of the Lok Sabha

Notes

Lok Sabha constituencies in Jharkhand
Palamu district
Garhwa district